Ananga Udaya Singh Deo, also known as A U Singh Deo is a politician from Odisha, India. He is elected to the Rajya Sabha in 2014 from Odisha.

He is a former Member of Odisha Legislative Assembly representing from Bolangir constituency. He is said to be a close friend of Odisha Chief Minister Naveen Patnaik as both were students of The Doon School, though Anang Uday Singh Deo was Two years senior to Naveen Patnaik. He was cabinet minister in Odisha Government with portfolios like PWD, Excise, Mines and others but last time in 2011 he had to step down as cabinet minister due to hooch tragedy in Cuttack. His son Kalikesh Singh Deo was a member of parliament of 16th Lok Sabha.

References

External links
ws.ori.nic.in
orissa.gov.in

1945 births
Living people
People from Odisha
People from Balangir
Odisha politicians
Members of the Odisha Legislative Assembly
Biju Janata Dal politicians
Rajya Sabha members from Odisha
The Doon School alumni